Humphrey Chetham (10 July 1580 – 1653) was an English textile merchant, financier and philanthropist, responsible for the creation of Chetham's Hospital and Chetham's Library, the oldest public library in the English-speaking world.

Life
Chetham was born in Crumpsall, Lancashire, England, the son of Henry Chetham, a successful Manchester merchant who lived in Crumpsall Hall and his wife, Jane (c.1542–1616), the daughter of Robert Wroe of Heaton. He was educated at Manchester Grammar School, and in 1597 was apprenticed to Samuel Tipping, a Manchester linen draper.

In 1605, he moved to London with his brother George and set up a partnership with him trading in various textiles. The business was successful, since the fabric was bought in London and sold for a higher price in Manchester. He acquired Clayton Hall in Manchester as his home, and in 1628 was also able to buy Turton Tower from William Orrell.

In 1631, he was asked to be knighted after his huge wealth became known to the crown, but he declined the honour, and so was fined. In 1635, he became the High Sheriff of Lancashire , a job he was unable to refuse, and in 1643 he was forced into the position of General Treasurer of Lancashire, which he found very difficult for his age.

He also began to obtain debts, and he feared that on his death parliament would take his money. He therefore donated money to form a blue coat school for forty poor boys, which later became Chetham's Hospital and then Chetham's School of Music. He also left money to establish Chetham's Library, including funds to pay for books. More libraries were constructed later on from this money.

Legacy
After Chetham's death, in 1653, at Clayton Hall the school and library opened. Chetham's contribution is commemorated by a statue and a window in Manchester Cathedral and by a statue and mural in Manchester Town Hall. By prior arrangement, Clayton Hall was left to the surviving nephew, George.

Chetham is also remembered in the name of the Chetham Society, a text publication society concerned with the history of North West England, founded at a meeting at Chetham's Library in 1843.

Arms

References

Notes

Bibliography

External links 
Official site of Chetham's Library

1580 births
1653 deaths
People educated at Manchester Grammar School
People from Crumpsall
English merchants
17th-century merchants
17th-century English businesspeople
High Sheriffs of Lancashire